Olivers Twist is a 2002 television series featuring chef Jamie Oliver. The name of the program is a play on the title of Charles Dickens' novel Oliver Twist. Following the popularity of his first TV series, The Naked Chef, Oliver began producing Olivers Twist to be aired outside the UK. The show became a success — being aired in over 70 countries — and helped establish Oliver's global popularity.

Production 
The show was produced by Oliver's own production company, Fresh One Productions, and 52 episodes were aired in total. All music for the show was composed by Leigh Haggerwood. "Just the Start", the theme song, was performed by Scarlet Division, the band for which Oliver has been a drummer for since 1989.

Episodes

Series 1 (2002–03)

Series 2 (2003–04)

References

External links
 

Food Network original programming
2002 British television series debuts
British cooking television shows
2000s British cooking television series
2004 British television series debuts
English-language television shows